Ijare is  a town in Ifedore Local Government Area of Ondo State, Nigeria. It lies around 20 km north-northeast of the city of Akure.  A traditionally Yoruba-speaking area, the town maintains a ceremonial ruler from the pre-colonial era, the Olujare of Ijare.  The town has two Secondary Schools: Anglican Grammar School (founded in 1972) and  the C.A.C. Comprehensive High School. It has a Post Office (commissioned in 1969), a Community Bank, three Health Centres and had its public water supply system (commissioned in 1970)renovated in late 2006.

References

Ijare, Nigeria Page. Falling Rain Genomics, Inc. 1996–2004. Accessed 2009-05-22.

Populated places in Ekiti State